The Main road 32 is a northwest-southeast direction Secondary class main road in Hungary, that connecting Hatvan (Hatvan-kelet junction in M3 motorway) with Szolnok (the Main road 4 and Main road 406 junction). The road is 80 km long.

The road, as well as all other main roads in Hungary, is managed and maintained by Magyar Közút, state owned company.

Municipalities
The Main road 12 runs through the following municipalities:
 Heves County: Hatvan
 Jász-Nagykun-Szolnok County: Jászfényszaru, Pusztamonostor, Jászberény, Jásztelek, Alattyán, Jánoshida, Jászalsószentgyörgy, Szászberek, Újszász, Zagyvarékas, Szolnok

Route plan

Sources

See also

 Roads in Hungary
 Transport in Hungary

External links

 Hungarian Public Road Non-Profit Ltd. (Magyar Közút Nonprofit Zrt.)
 National Infrastructure Developer Ltd.

Main roads in Hungary
Heves County
Transport in Jász-Nagykun-Szolnok County